Brigadier Michael Nyarwa, is a Ugandan military officer in the Uganda People's Defence Forces (UPDF). Effective 2018, he is the Commander of UPDF Marine Forces, a specialized division of the Ugandan military, responsible for security, safe travel and responsible use of Uganda's waterways, including lakes and rivers.

In addition to security, the Uganda marine unit enforces fishing laws on Ugandan waterways. They also participate in international peace-keeping missions. The Uganda Marine Forces assist in national waterway rescue missions, as well.

See also

References

External links
 Brigade Commander of UPDF Marines Brigade, Michael Nyarwa explains their operation to pull out of water the ill-fated boat wreckage As of 28 November 2018.

Succession table

Living people
Year of birth missing (living people)
Ugandan military personnel
People from Western Region, Uganda